The 2007 US Open boys' doubles was an event that was won by Jonathan Eysseric and Jerome Inzerillo.

Seeds

Draw

Finals

Top half

Bottom half

External links
Draw

Boys' Doubles
US Open, 2007 Boys' Doubles